Aquae Albae in Byzacena was an Ancient city and bishopric in Roman Africa and remains a Latin Catholic titular see.

Its present location is Ain-Beida, in modern Tunisia (which has namesakes, notably in Algeria and Morocco).

History 
Aquae Albae was important enough in the Roman province of Byzacena to become one of the many suffragans of its capital Hadrumetum's Metropolitan Archbishop, but was to fade.

Titular see 
The diocese was nominally restored in 1933 as a Latin Catholic titular bishopric.

It has had the following incumbents, all of the lowest (episcopal) rank :
 Aimable Chassaigne (1962.01.23 – 1962.04.06)
 Paul Chevrier (1962.08.21 – 1968.10.04)
 Ramón Ovidio Pérez Morales (1970.12.02 – 1980.05.20) (later Archbishop)
 Anthony Joseph Bevilacqua (1980.10.04 – 1983.10.10) as Auxiliary Bishop of Brooklyn (NYC, USA) (1980.02.11 – 1983.10.10); later Bishop of Pittsburgh (USA) (1983.10.10 – 1988.02.11), Metropolitan Archbishop of Philadelphia (USA) (1988.02.11 – 2003.07.15), created Cardinal-Priest of SS. Redentore e S. Alfonso in Via Merulana (1991.06.28 – 2012.01.31)
 Piotr Krupa (1984.02.18 – ...), Auxiliary Bishop emeritus of Pelplin (Poland)

See also 
 Aquae Albae in Mauretania
 Aquae in Byzacena
 Catholic Church in Algeria
 Catholic Church in Tunisia

References

External links 
 GCatholic, with titular incumbent biography links

Catholic titular sees in Africa
Roman towns and cities in Africa (Roman province)